Zinc finger protein 655 is a protein that in humans is encoded by the ZNF655 gene.

This gene encodes a zinc finger protein. The zinc finger proteins are involved in DNA binding and protein–protein interactions. Multiple alternatively spliced transcript variants encoding distinct isoforms have been found for this gene.

References

Further reading

External links 
 

Transcription factors